Jackson T.-S. Sun, also known as Jackson Tianshin Sun, is a Taiwanese linguist working on languages of the Sino-Tibetan and Austroasiatic families. He is best known for his pioneering documentation and historical-comparative work in Tani, Rgyalrongic, and Tibetic languages.

Biography 
Sun was born in 1956. He earned his doctorate in Linguistics at the University of California at Berkeley in 1993, where he worked under James A. Matisoff in the Sino-Tibetan Etymological Dictionary and Thesaurus (STEDT) project on the reconstruction and classification of the Tani languages. He is currently a Distinguished Research Fellow at the Institute of Linguistics of the Academia Sinica, where he served as Director from 2008 till 2011, and a Chair Professor at the Department of English at National Taiwan Normal University. He was elected an Academician of the Academia Sinica in 2018.

Selected publications

Journal articles and book chapters

2019. The ancestry of Horpa: Further morphological evidence. In Kong, Jiangping (ed.), Ancestry of the languages and peoples of China (Journal of Chinese Linguistics Monograph Series, Number 28). Hong Kong: The Chinese University Press.
2018. The Synchronic and diachronic phonology of Va: A Wa-Lawa language of Yunnan. Linguistics of the Tibeto-Burman Area 41(2), 133–174.
2018. Evidentials and person. In Alexandra Y. Aikhenvald (ed.), The Oxford handbook of evidentiality, 47–63. Oxford: Oxford University Press.
2017. (共同作者：田阡子、邱振豪)〈上東谷霍爾語的發聲態對立〉.《中國語言學報》45(1). 1-19.
2017. Pang phonology and vocabulary. In Sun Jingtao et al. (eds.), Frontiers in Sinitic and Sino-Tibetan linguistics: studies in the languages of China festschrift in Honor of Professor Ting Pang-Hsin on his 80th birthday, 630–650. Beijing: Social Sciences Academic Press. 
2017. (with Mark Post). Tani languages. In Graham Thurgood & Randy J. LaPolla (eds.), The Sino-Tibetan languages, 2nd Ed., 322–337. New York: Taylor & Francis.
2017. Tshobdun Rgyalrong. In Graham Thurgood & Randy J. LaPolla (eds.), The Sino-Tibetan Languages, 2nd Ed., 557–571. New York: Taylor & Francis. 
2016. (with Evans, Jonathan P. & Chiu, Chenhao & Liou, Michelle). Uvular approximation as an articulatory vowel feature. Journal of the International Phonetic Association 45(3). 1-30.
2016. (with Jonathan Evans). Qiang. In Rint Sybesma et al. (eds.), Encyclopedia of Chinese Language and Linguistics, 517–526. Leiden: Brill.
2015. 〈黑水縣沙石多嘉戎語動詞人稱範疇的特點〉. 《語言暨語言學》16(5). 731–749.
2014. Sino-Tibetan: Part 3 Rgyalrong. In Rochelle Lieber & Pavol Štekauer (eds.), The Oxford Handbook of Derivational Morphology, 630–650. Oxford: Oxford University Press. 
2014. Typology of Generic-Person Marking in Tshobdun Rgyalrong. In Richard VanNess Simmons & Newell Ann Van Auken (eds.), Festschrift to Honor South Coblin: Studies in Chinese and Sino-Tibetan Linguistics: Dialect, Phonology, Transcription and Text (Language and Linguistics Monograph Series 53), 225–248. Taipei: Institute of Linguistics, Academia Sinica.
2014. Typology of Generic-Person Marking in Tshobdun Rgyalrong. In Simmons, Richard VanNess & Van Auken, Newell Ann (eds.), Festschrift to honor South Coblin: Studies in Chinese and Sino-Tibetan linguistics: Dialect, phonology, transcription and text (Language and Linguistics Monographs 53), 225–248. Taipei: Institute of Linguistics, Academia Sinica. 
2014. (共同作者：田阡子)〈霍爾語格西話動詞對協初探〉.《中國語言學集刊》7(2). 221–241.
2013. (共同作者：余文生)〈麻窩羌語元音音系再探〉.石鋒、彭剛編,《大江東去—王士元教授八十歲賀壽文集》,135-151.香港:香港城市大學出版社.
2012. Complementation in Caodeng rGyalrong. Language and Linguistics 13(3). 471–498.  
2007. The irrealis category in rGyalrong. Language and Linguistics 8(3). 797–819. 
2006. 〈嘉戎語動詞的派生形態〉.《民族語文》4. 3-14. 
2006. 〈草登嘉戎語的關係句〉.《語言暨語言學》7(4). 905–933. 
2004. Verb-stem variations in Showu rGyalrong. In Lin, Ying-chin et al. (eds.), Studies on Sino-Tibetan languages: Papers in honor of Professor Hwang-Cherng Gong on His seventieth birthday, 269–296. Taipei: Institute of Linguistics, Academia Sinica.
2004. Verb-stem variations in Showu rGyalrong. In Ying-chin Lin et al. (eds.), Language and Linguistics: Studies on Sino-Tibetan Languages: Papers in Honor of Professor Hwang-Cherng Gong on His Seventieth Birthday, 269–296. Taipei: Institute of Linguistics, Academia Sinica. 
2003. Phonological profile of Zhongu: A new Tibetan dialect of Northern Sichuan. Language and Linguistics 4(4). 769–836.  
2003. Tani languages. In Graham Thurgood & Randy J. LaPolla (eds.), Sino-Tibetan languages, 456–466. London and New York: Routledge.
2003. Variegated tonal developments in Tibetan. In David Bradley & Randy LaPolla & Boyd Michailovsky & Graham Thurgood (eds.), Pacific Linguistics:  Language Variation: Papers on Variation and Change in the Sinosphere and in the Indosphere in Honour of James A. Matisoff, 35–51. Canberra: Pacific Linguistics, Research School of Pacific and Asian Studies, ANU.
2003. Caodeng rGyalrong. In Graham Thurgood & Randy LaPolla (eds.), Sino-Tibetan languages, 490–502. London and New York: Routledge. 
2002. (共同作者：石丹羅)〈草登嘉戎語與「認同等第」相關的語法現象〉.《語言暨語言學》 3(1). 79–99. 
2000. Stem alternations in Puxi verb inflection. Language and Linguistics 1(2). 211–232. 
2000. Parallelisms in the verb morphology of Sidaba rGyalrong and Guanyinqiao in rGyalrongic. Language and Linguistics 1(1). 161–190. 
1993. Evidentials in Amdo Tibetan. Bulletin of the Institute of History and Philology 63(4). 143–188.

Books 
In press. Tshobdun Rgyalrong spoken texts: With a grammatical Introduction. (Language and Linguistics Monograph). Taipei: Institute of Linguistics, Academia Sinica.
Jackson T.-S. Sun (ed.). 2014. Phonological Profiles of Little-Studied Tibetic Varieties. Language and Linguistics Monograph Series 55. Taipei: Institute of Linguistics, Academia Sinica.
Jackson T.-S. Sun. 1993. A historical-comparative study of the Tani (Mirish) branch in Tibeto-Burman. PhD dissertation, University of California at Berkeley.
Jackson T.-S. Sun. 1986. Aspects of the phonology of Amdo Tibetan: Ndzorge Sháme Xra dialect (Monumenta Serindica No. 16). Tokyo: Institute for the Study of Languages and Cultures of Asia and Africa.

References

External links 
 Jackson T.-S. Sun's Academia.edu page ; Jackson T.-S. Sun's Academia Sinica page

Living people
1956 births
UC Berkeley College of Letters and Science alumni
Members of Academia Sinica
Academic staff of the National Taiwan Normal University
Linguists of Sino-Tibetan languages